Mohammad Mahdi Yaghoubi (2 April 1930 – 25 September 2021) was an Iranian bantamweight freestyle wrestler. He competed at the 1952, 1956 and 1960 Olympics and won a silver medal in 1956. He also won a bronze medal at the 1951 World Wrestling Championships and placed fifth in 1954.

Yaghoubi had four brothers and four sisters. He quit school at the age of 15 to make free time for work and sport.

References

External links
 

1930 births
2021 deaths
Olympic wrestlers of Iran
Wrestlers at the 1952 Summer Olympics
Wrestlers at the 1956 Summer Olympics
Wrestlers at the 1960 Summer Olympics
Iranian male sport wrestlers
Olympic silver medalists for Iran
Olympic medalists in wrestling
People from Qazvin
Medalists at the 1956 Summer Olympics
World Wrestling Championships medalists